Habeas Corpus Suspension Act may refer to several Acts of Parliament or Acts of Congress relating to habeas corpus:

 Habeas Corpus Suspension Acts of 1688 of the Parliament of England
 Habeas Corpus Suspension Act 1745 of the Parliament of Great Britain
 Habeas Corpus Suspension Act 1794 of the Parliament of Great Britain
 Habeas Corpus Suspension Act 1798 of the Parliament of Great Britain
 Habeas Corpus Suspension Act 1799 of the Parliament of Great Britain
 Habeas Corpus Suspension Act 1817 of the Parliament of the United Kingdom
 Habeas Corpus Suspension Act (1863) of the United States Congress

See also
 Habeas Corpus Act (disambiguation)